"One Shot" is the second track from the album Tin Machine II by Tin Machine. It was released as the third single from the album, making it their sixth single overall, and the last single released by the band.

Background and recording
Originally recorded in 1989 after the first Tin Machine Tour, several demo recordings of rehearsals of the song exist and were eventually leaked online. As the second Tin Machine album was being released by a new label, label executives requested that the song be re-recorded by "notable" producer Hugh Padgham, who had previously worked with David Bowie on his 1984 album Tonight. This newly-recorded version was, according to Reeves Gabrels, a note-by-note remake of the original with a slightly better guitar solo.

The b-side, an original song by Hunt Sales and Bowie, was described by Nicholas Pegg as your "standard pseudo-sexist Tin Machine fare". A one-minute excerpt from the end of the song appears as a hidden track at the end of the Tin Machine II album.

Track listing

European CD single (London/Victory 869 574-2)
 "One Shot"– 4:02
 "Hammerhead"– 3:14

US promo CD (Victory CDP 522)
 "One Shot" (single version) – 4:02
 The CD was released in a tri-fold CD case, which folded out to show one of the Kouros statues from the album's cover, with the front of the statue on the inside and the back on the outside. The single was cut to allow the statue to appear to be holding the CD in its arms. Unlike the US album release, the statue's penis was not airbrushed out.

Production credits
Producers
 Tin Machine
 Hugh Padgham

Musicians
 David Bowie – lead vocals, guitar
 Reeves Gabrels – lead guitar
 Hunt Sales – drums, vocals
 Tony Sales – bass, vocals
 Kevin Armstrong – rhythm guitar

Chart performance

References

Pegg, Nicholas, The Complete David Bowie, Reynolds & Hearn Ltd, 2000, 

1991 singles
Tin Machine songs
Songs written by Reeves Gabrels
Songs written by David Bowie
Song recordings produced by Hugh Padgham
1989 songs
Music videos directed by Dominic Sena
London Records singles